Pelsall is a village in the Metropolitan Borough of Walsall, West Midlands, England. Forming part of the borough's border with Staffordshire, Pelsall is located 4 miles north of Walsall, midway between the towns of Bloxwich and Brownhills and 4 miles northwest of Aldridge. The southern edge of Cannock Chase is 6 miles to the north. Pelsall is also 8 miles southwest of Lichfield and 8 miles northeast of Wolverhampton.

History

Pelsall was first mentioned in a charter of 994, when it was among various lands given to the monastery at Heantune (Wolverhampton) by Wulfrun, a Mercian noblewoman. At this time it was called Peolshalh, meaning 'a nook' or 'land between two streams belonging to Peol'. The Domesday entry of 1086 describes Pelsall as being waste, still belonging to the church. A chapel of ease was built in about 1311. The medieval population was small and a return of 1563 lists only 14 householders. The original centre the area is now known as Old Town. In 1760 the remaining open fields were enclosed, but some holdings survived into the next century in Hall Field, High Ley, The Riddings Field and Final Field. The tithe map of about 1840 records some evidence of the medieval strip farming system.

In the second quarter of the 19th century, clusters of houses were built on the fringes of the extensive common land and at the Newlands. The greatest concentration was in what is now the village centre. This area gradually developed; a Methodist Chapel and school were opened in about 1836, in the modern day Station Road and a new St Michael's Church was built in 1844 – the old one in Paradise Lane had been considered too small for the growing population. Towards the end of the 19th century, shops became established in Norton Road and High Street. The population in 1801 was 477 and by 1901 had grown to 3,626. Pelsall had become a mining village; in places deposits of coal were found only a few yards from the surface and by about 1800 the shallow and deep seams were 'much worked'. The cutting of the canal in about 1794 opened up the area for industrialisation, with entrepreneurs and landowners quickly exploiting the mineral wealth. Nailmaking, traditionally a cottage industry, was also carried out locally; in the census of 1841 thirty men stated this as their occupation.

On 14 November 1872, 22 miners died when the Pelsall Hall Colliery was flooded. 21 of the 22 miners were buried underneath a polished granite obelisk in the churchyard of St Michael and All Angels Church.

An ironworks was established on the North Common which grew into a sizeable concern under the ownership of Messrs. Davis and Bloomer. This, together with Yorks Foundry and that of Ernest Wilkes and Co. at Mouse Hill, gave Pelsall a share of the heavy iron trade during the 19th century. Ernest Wilkes and Co. survived until 1977, but the others ceased trading in the 1890s and the pits became unworkable, mainly due to continual flooding problems. Several working farms survived in the local area until after the Second World War. Since then much land has been used for housing development but the ancient common remains.

Governance
Pelsall is part of the Aldridge-Brownhills Parliamentary constituency. At the 2015 general election, the seat was held by Wendy Morton (Conservative) with a majority of 11,723 over Labour's John Fisher. The seat has been held by the Conservative Party since 3 May 1979.

Pelsall Ward has three seats on Walsall Metropolitan Borough Council. The three current councillors, all Conservative, are Garry Perry, former Mayor of Walsall, re-elected in 2012; Marco Longhi, elected in 2011; and Sally Neville, elected in 2018.

Landmarks

The Fingerpost, at the junction of B4154 Norton Road and A4124 Lichfield Road, is an unusual and possibly unique design, being substantially restored in the 1980s by Bert Kellitt for the local Civic Society. Pelsall Social Club is at the junction of these roads. Since the late 1990s, Pelsall has had a Millennium Stone, marking the 994–1994 millennium of the village.

Pelsall is quite 'green' with a large turf central common around which previously stood several public houses: only The Railway and The Queens (formerly The Block & Chopper) survive today, with The Old House at Home further up towards the Fingerpost. Pelsall Carnival takes place in July each year, featuring decorated floats and bric-a-brac stalls. It has run continuously since 1972 with the exception of 2020.

The main shopping area serving the town is bordered by Norton Road and High Street and includes a range of shops, including a butcher, plus a variety of food outlets. On the northern edge of the village centre there is The Old House at Home public house, while the Fingerpost pub (formerly The Royal Oak) is situated just north of the Fingerpost road junction at Yorks Bridge, near to Pelsall Junction on the Wyrley and Essington Canal, and Nest Common and North Common, on the border with South Staffordshire. Pelsall has lost several pubs in recent years, including The Free Trade in Wood Lane, which, though the building remains, has been closed for several years, and The Swan on Wolverhampton Road, which in 2007 was converted to an Indian restaurant. The Red Cow public house and its car park have been converted into flats; the Old Bush stands derelict after several arson attacks and is now subject to a proposal by Aldi to build a supermarket and care home on the site.

In 1997, the Donna Cooper Memorial Garden was created in the village in memory of thirteen-year-old Donna Cooper, who died after being knocked over by a stolen car outside her home in Pelsall Lane, Rushall on 6 January 1993. The driver and one of his four accomplices were both on bail at the time, after being arrested in connection with a hit-and-run incident in which two men had been injured in December 1992. The driver of the car received a seven-year prison sentence for manslaughter and the front seat passenger received a four-and-half years sentence on a double charge of aggravated vehicle taking, which was later reduced on appeal by one year. Three other defendants (all aged under 18) received non-custodial sentences for their lesser involvement in the car theft which led to the death of Donna Cooper. The garden was commissioned by Walsall Metropolitan Borough Council, who also maintain it. The entrance consists of an arched gateway that contains an owl motif, taken from a design drawn by Cooper shortly before her death.

Transport

Pelsall once had a comprehensive bus network which included bus 89, which connected it to Wolverhampton, Bloxwich, Wednesfield and New Cross Hospital. This allowed passengers to interchange at both Bloxwich station on the Chase Line and at Wolverhampton station for further travel to Shropshire, Staffordshire and Manchester. The bus was axed in a 28 April 2019 bus timetable change by National Express West Midlands. It was cut back to Bloxwich instead of Walsall and to Wolverhampton. This meant passengers having to change at Bloxwich for further travel although bus service is half-hourly. As from 29th August 2021, this link has been restored with service 9 (Walsall-Bloxwich) extended along the route of service 60 which had replaced the 89 between Bloxwich and Wolverhampton.

There is a rapid connection to the nearby towns of Brownhills, Cannock, and Walsall but the nearest rail connections are Walsall, Landywood, Cannock, Penkridge, Shenstone, and Lichfield. There is also a six-journey off-peak service to Kingstanding via Aldridge and Pheasey, as well as a direct Brownhills to Bloxwich service, however this only runs from 8am-4pm from Monday to Saturday.

Pelsall previously had a railway station on the South Staffordshire Line that ran east of the village: this closed to passengers in the 1960s and to freight in the 1980s. Only the main road bridges survive as evidence. The line and station have been mooted for reopening since the early 2000s, but low demand has kept the line and station from being reopened. A study carried out in 2009 by the Department for Transport suggested a new station at each of Pelsall and Brownhills. In 2000, the track bed from Walsall to Pelsall was made into part of the SUSTRANS National Cycle Route 5. The line through Pelsall has been identified as a disused rail corridor and this means that it is a long-term ambition to reopen the line in the near future.

Ethnicity and religion
Pelsall is predominately White British with the remainder comprising 1.2% Asian and 2.8% other, making the ward of Pelsall 96% white and 4% non-white minorities. Christianity is the largest religion in the borough at 75% of the population, followed by no religion at 18%.

Places of worship

The parish church of Pelsall is St Michael & All Angels Church. Other places of worship are Pelsall Evangelical Church and Pelsall Methodist Church.

Education
Pelsall is home to three primary schools: St Michael's C of E Primary, Pelsall Village School and Ryders Hayes School (now an Academy). Additionally, First Friends Day Nursery is located at the Pelsall Education Development Centre.

Pelsall was previously served by Pelsall Comprehensive School, although this was technically over the border in neighbouring Rushall.  It opened in the autumn of 1963 as an 11–15 secondary modern school before adopting 13–18 comprehensive status in September 1972. The transfer age was reduced to 11 in September 1986 under Walsall's reorganisation of education in the former Aldridge-Brownhills area, but falling pupil numbers led to its closure in July 1994. The old Pelsall Comprehensive buildings are now home to Rushall JMI School, Education Walsall offices, and a teacher training centre.

Sport
Pelsall's main football team was Pelsall Villa, formed in 1961, which played in the Midland Football League until 2018 when it disbanded. The club's former ground on Walsall Road neighbours Pelsall Cricket Club and the derelict Old Bush pub.

Pelsall North Common 

According to the Nature Conservancy, Pelsall North Common is a "Site of Importance for Nature Conservation" and "Local Nature Reserve" (SINC).

References

External links 

 Common People – local news blog
 Pelsall Pride Partnership
 Pelsall Online
 Pelsall Community Association
 Pelsall History Centre's site
 Information relating to the Pelsall Hall Colliery disaster of 1872
 The story of the 32nd (Aldridge) Battalion, South Staffordshire Home Guard, 1940–1944

Walsall
Villages in the West Midlands (county)
Conservation areas in England